Czy mnie jeszcze pamiętasz? ("Do You Remember Me?") is Czesław Niemen's third solo album, released in 1969. It was his last album recorded with Akwarele.

Track listing 
 "Wiem, że nie wrócisz" ("I know you won't return) – 3:56 (music Czesław Niemen, lyrics Jacek Grań)
 "Baw się w ciuciubabkę" ("Let's play blind-man's buff") – 3:03 (music Czesław Niemen, lyrics Jacek Grań)
 "Obok nas" ("Besides us") – 3:16 (music Wojciech Piętowski, lyrics Janusz Odrowąż)
 "Nie wiem czy to warto" ("I don't know if it's worth loving you") – 4:16 (music Zbigniew Bizoń, lyrics Krzysztof Dzikowski)
 "Przyjdź w taką noc" ("Come in such a night") – 2:16 (music Mateusz Święcicki, lyrics Krzysztof Dzikowski)
 "Czy mnie jeszcze pamiętasz?" ("Do you remember me?") – 3:30 (music Czesław Niemen, lyrics Jacek Grań)
 "Pod papugami" ("Under parrots") – 3:20 (music Mateusz Święcicki, lyrics Bogusław Choiński and Jan Gałkowski)
 "Jeszcze sen" ("Still a dream") – 2:45 (music Czesław Niemen, lyrics Marta Bellan)
 "Stoję w oknie" ("I'm standing in the window") – 3:12 (music Czesław Niemen, lyrics Edward Fiszer)
 "Czas jak rzeka" ("Time flows like a river") – 2:38 (music and lyrics Czesław Niemen)
 "Ach, jakie oczy" ("Oh, what eyes") – 2:32 (music and lyrics Czesław Niemen)

Personnel 
Czesław Niemen – vocal, organ
Zbigniew Sztyc – tenor saxophone 
Tomasz Buttowtt – drums
Tomasz Jaśkiewicz – guitar
Ryszard Podgórski – trumpet
Marian Zimiński – piano, organ
Tadeusz Gogosz – bass
Partita - background vocals

References

Czesław Niemen albums
1969 albums
Polish-language albums
Polskie Nagrania Muza albums